Thibault Jaques (born 29 March 1988) is a French professional footballer who plays as a defender for  club Versailles.

Career
Jaques joined FC Chambly in 2016, and captained them to their first ever promotion to the Ligue 2 in 2015. He made his professional debut with Chambly in a 1–0 Ligue 2 win over Valenciennes FC on 26 July 2019, scoring the game winning goal and the first ever for Chambly in the division. As a starter in the Chambly defense during this 2019–20 season, he was voted into the Ligue 2 Team of the Season by France Football.

In June 2022, Jaques moved to Versailles.

Honours
Individual
 France Football Team of the Season: 2019–20

References

External links
 
 
 Foot National Profile

1988 births
Living people
People from Talence
French footballers
Association football defenders
FC Chambly Oise players
SR Colmar players
US Boulogne players
Football Bourg-en-Bresse Péronnas 01 players
FC Versailles 78 players
Ligue 2 players
Championnat National players
Championnat National 2 players
Footballers from Nouvelle-Aquitaine